The Ford B series is a bus chassis that was manufactured by the Ford Motor Company.  Produced across six generations from 1948 to 1998, the B series was a variant of the medium-duty Ford F series.  As a cowled-chassis design, the B series was a bare chassis aft of the firewall, intended for bodywork from a second-stage manufacturer.  While primarily used for school bus applications in the United States and Canada, the chassis was exported worldwide to manufacturers to construct bus bodies for various uses.

Prior to 1969, Lincoln-Mercury dealers in Canada marketed the B series as part of the Mercury M-series truck line.  At the time, rural Canadian communities were serviced by either a Ford or a Lincoln-Mercury dealer network, but not both networks concurrently.  

Coinciding with the late 1996 sale of the Louisville/AeroMax heavy-truck line to Sterling Trucks, Ford phased out the medium-duty F series and the B series following the 1998 model year.  For 2000, Ford re-entered the medium-duty segment with the F-650/F-750 Super Duty.  As of the 2019 model year, Ford has not developed a cowled-chassis derivative of the F series, instead concentrating on  cutaway chassis vehicles.  In the cowled-chassis segment, the role and market share of the B series was largely superseded by the Blue Bird Vision (introduced in late 2000's).

Series overview
For 1948, the B series (B=bus) was introduced as a variant of the all-new Ford F-series truck line, designed as a cowled chassis variant of the F-5 and F-6 (1 ½ and 2-ton) medium-duty conventional.  For 1953, the B series shifted to a 3-digit model nomenclature that remains in use by Ford today.  Subsequently, Ford sold the B-600, B-700, and B-800 (prior to 1991, diesel-powered versions were badged with an extra "0").  

For its entire 50-year production run, the B series paralleled the medium-duty F series in its development.  Before 1967, the medium-duty F series shared its front bodywork with F-series pickup trucks; from 1967, medium-duty trucks were given wider front axles and their own front bodywork, with the B-Series cowl shared entirely from medium-duty trucks.   One further generation was produced, introduced in 1980 (with a minor update in 1995).

First generation (1948–1952)

For 1948, as Ford introduced the Ford F-series as its first dedicated truck platform, the B-series made its debut.  Based on the medium-duty F-5 and F-6 (1½ and 2-ton), the B series was slotted between the pickup trucks and the "Big Job" conventionals.  In 1951, the grille trim was redesigned, with the horizontal grille bars replaced by wider-spread vertical ones.

Sharing the engines with the F-5 and F6, a 95hp 226 inline 6 was standard, with a 100hp Flathead V8 and a 110hp 254 inline-six as options.

Second generation (1953–1956)
In 1953, Ford celebrated their 50th anniversary and the B series saw a redesign with new B-"00" designations added to the name.  The redesign implemented a set back front axle that made the front look nose heavy, but allowed for a tighter turning radius. The hood was also longer and flowed into the fenders. The grille was still horizontal, but was two bars as opposed to the one large one in the previous model. 1954 buses received a refreshed grille and a new OHV V8 engine option to replace the old 239 Flathead V8. The 1956 buses got a new wraparound windshield and restyled dashboards as well as a new grille that was similar to the 1953 model year.

Engines

 OHV I6 (1953)
 Flathead V8 (1953)
 OHV "Mileage Maker" I6 (1954–1956)
  Ford Y-Block OHV V8 (1954–1955)
 Ford Y-Block OHV V8 (1956)

Third generation (1957–1960) 

In 1957 the B series got a redesigned front end and a new dash area. The front hood was now flush with the fenders creating a more boxy look. The 1958 models saw a new grille and quad headlamps along with new circular gages.

Engines
 Ford "Mileage Maker" I6 (1958–1960)
 Ford Y-Block V8 (1957)
 Ford Y-Block V8 (1958–1960)
 Lincoln Y-block V8

Fourth generation (1961–1966)

The B series was redesigned for 1961 offering a new horizontal grille and fenders that were flared just above the front wheel to allow for larger wheels. The new chassis and front fascia made the truck look lower and wider than previous years. The quad head lamps were replaced with single lights integrated into the grille. The frame and suspension were also redesigned to be tougher than before. This generation of B series would be the last to utilize the same front fascia as light duty Ford trucks.  Both the B series and medium duty F series were to gain their own look.

Engines
 Ford I6 (1961–1964)
 Ford Y-Block V8 (1961–1963)
 Ford FT V8 (1964–1966)
 Ford FT V8 (1964–1966)
 Ford FT V8 (1964–1966)
 Ford 240 I6 (1965–1966)
 Ford 300 I6 (1965–1966)

Fifth generation (1967–1979)

Ford completely redesigned both the B series and medium-duty F series and departed from using the same grilles as the lighter duty F-series trucks. The new buses were taller and wider with a large grille utilizing much of the space of the front fascia. The new grille was rectangular with the single headlights being placed very near the far ends of the grille.  The fenders were even more flared than before to allow for a wider track and larger wheels and tires needed to make the necessary gain in GVW to remain competitive.  This generation was also the first to receive the option of a diesel engine in place of the strictly gasoline lineup in the past.  An extra "0" was added to the series notation on diesel models.  After 1968, the Mercury-branded version of the B series was discontinued in the Canadian market.  For 1973, the grille was updated with longer teardrops around the headlights and F O R D block lettering appeared on the front of the hood just above the grille.

Engines
Gasoline
 Ford FT V8 (1967–1977)
 Ford FT V8 (1967–1977)
 Ford FT V8 (1967–1977)
 Ford 385/Lima V8 (1978–1979)
Diesel
Caterpillar 1140 V8 (1968–1974) B-6000 Only
Caterpillar 1145 V8 (1968–1974) B-6000 and B-7000
Caterpillar 3208 V8 (1975–1978) B-7000 Only

Sixth generation (1980–1998) 
For 1980, the B-Series was redesigned for the first time since 1967 production.  Again sharing model commonality with the medium-duty F-Series, the model line saw significant external design changes; in place of the long-running full-width hood, Ford shifted to a narrower hoodline combined with separate fenders.  In another change, the grille shifted its design influence from F-Series light trucks to the L-Series "Louisville" heavy trucks.  

In production across 19 model years, this is the longest-produced version of the B-Series; for 1995, the model line received a redesign of the hood.

1980–1994

For 1980, the sixth-generation B-Series was derived from the F-700, F-800, and F-8000 (diesel).  As a cowled chassis (produced without a cab) with no interior, the B-Series was produced with a revised dashboard from the previous generation.  For 1984, the medium-duty F-Series and B-Series adopted the Ford Blue Oval emblem, replacing the "FORD" lettering in the center of the grille; other revisions were made to cowl badging.  As an option, a tilt-forward hood was introduced alongside the standard rear-hinged hood; on the B-series, the tilting hood would become standard by the end of the 1980s.  

Engines

For its 1980 launch, the sixth-generation was offered with three engines.  Alongside the 6.1L (370) gasoline V8 and the Caterpillar 3208 V8 diesel (Ford B-8000), a Detroit Diesel four-stroke 8.2L V8 was introduced as an option.  For 1982, Ford introduced a 7.0L gasoline engine as an option.         

During the 1980s and early 1990s, the engine offerings would undergo several revisions.  For 1985, as part of a joint venture with New Holland, Ford introduced a 6.6L and 7.8L inline-6 diesel sourced from Brazil.  For 1991, the Caterpillar 3208 and Detroit Diesel V8s were withdrawn (following the discontinuation of the latter); it would also serve as the final year for the 6.1L gasoline V8.  For 1992, Ford introduced Cummins 6BT and C8.3 diesels; for 1993, they would replace the Ford-New Holland diesels entirely.     

Gasoline
 Ford 385/Lima V8 (1980–1991)
 Ford 385/Lima V8 (1982–1994)

Diesel
8.2 L Detroit Diesel "Fuel Pincher" V8 (1980–1990)
6.6 L and 7.8 L Ford-New Holland I6 (1985–1992)
5.9 L Cummins 5.9 6BT I6 (1992–1998)
10.4 L Caterpillar "3208" V8 (1983–1990)
8.3 L Cummins "C8.3" I6 diesel (1992–1994)

1995–1998 

For 1995, the medium-duty F-Series underwent a model revision, improving the aerodynamics of the hood design, with the B-series following suit.  With few changes made to the chassis, the B-series retained the same steering column and instrument panel used since 1980.  For the first time, a tilt-steering column was offered as an option (distinguished by Ford-badged steering wheels sourced from International).    

The badging of the B-Series underwent a revision, ending the use of external B-700/B-800 designation; all cowl badges used "B-Series" badging.        

After a 50-year production run, the final B-series cowled bus chassis was produced as the sixth-generation medium-duty Ford F-Series ended its model cycle after the 1998 model year.    

Engines
While the 7.0L gasoline engine remained standard on the medium-duty F-Series, the 1995 B-series shifted entirely to diesel-fuel engines, using Cummins-sourced 5.9L and 8.3L inline-6 engines.  
5.9 L Cummins 5.9 6BT I6 diesel (1992–1998)
8.3 L Cummins 8.3 I6 diesel (1994–1998)

Discontinuation
While the medium-duty F-Series was redesigned for a seventh generation for the 1999 model year (topping the Super Duty line), the model line no longer included a B-Series cowled bus chassis.  Several factors would contribute to the discontinuation of the model line, related both to Ford and to bus manufacturers. 

From 1980 to 1998, the number of major school bus manufacturers using cowled bus chassis had been reduced from six to four (three, after 2001).  In an effort to secure their future, body manufacturers began a series of business agreements with chassis suppliers (with some becoming subsidiaries of the latter).  As the 1990s progressed, Ford was faced with the potential withdrawal of the B-series or entering into a supply agreement with a body manufacturer to guarantee a source of demand.  Following the 10-year agreement between General Motors and Blue Bird Corporation to standardize its B7 chassis (making Ford an extra-cost option); a potential arrangement proved increasingly difficult as AmTran and Thomas Built Buses were purchased outright in 1995 and 1998 by truck manufacturers Navistar and Freightliner, respectively.      

At the end of 1996, Ford sold the rights to its heavy-truck lines to Freightliner subsidiary of Daimler-Benz.  Redesigned less than a year before, the Louisville/Aeromax heavy trucks were reintroduced as the Sterling brand of trucks.  While the sale did not include the F-Series medium-duty trucks, a condition of the sale included a 10-year non-compete agreement, stipulating that the two companies would not introduce products in direct competition with one another.  Introduced in 1997, the Freightliner FS-65 (developed from its medium-duty FL-Series before the sale) would inherit much of the cowled-chassis market share vacated by the B series.  While Ford was able to continue the medium-duty F-Series (entering into the Blue Diamond joint venture with Navistar to produce the model line), the overlap that a bus chassis derived from it represented was a potential breakage of the non-compete agreement.    

In response to the conclusion of the Blue Bird/GM agreement, in 2002, Ford sought its own supply agreement with the company.  A few prototype vehicles were developed from F-650/F-750 Super Duty trucks (converted to cowled-chassis vehicles); the design did not lead to an agreement between the two companies.  Elements of its design were developed further, becoming the Blue Bird Vision; in place of a commercially-sourced chassis, the Vision uses a proprietary chassis.   

As of current production, Ford no longer produces a cowled-chassis bus in North America.  Shifting its production exclusively to cutaway vehicles, Ford produces vehicles derived from the Transit (350/350HD), E-Series (E-350/E-450), Super Duty (F-550), and medium-duty F-Series (F-650/F-750).  The vehicles are produced for multiple applications; along with school buses, the chassis are also used for shuttle buses, paratransit, and multiple commercial uses.

Body manufacturers
The B series was widely available and was used by many manufacturers throughout its production run.

References 
The Auto Editors of Consumer Guide Ford Truck Chronicle Lincolnwood, Illinois: Publications International. 2006.

See also

 School bus

School bus chassis
Ford platforms
B series
Vehicles introduced in 1948